The Point class is a class of six roll-on/roll-off sealift ships originally procured under a Private Finance Initiative to be available for use as naval auxiliaries to the British armed forces. Two of the ships have now been released from the contract, leaving four available for service with the military.

Background

The Point-class sealift ships are the result of the Strategic Defence Review and are designed by Houlder Ltd for the strategic transport of military cargoes and vehicles in times of need. The UK Ministry of Defence (MoD) has purchased a 22-year charter from Foreland Shipping (previously named AWSR Shipping), who own, operate and crew the ships, utilising them as merchant vessels when they are not required for military service. The small British crews are provided by Foreland Shipping and are required to be sponsored reserves as a condition of service, which means they can be called up to become part of the Armed Forces in times of crisis. The benefits of this is that it guarantees crews in times of crisis, it means crew members can be expected to work under the Armed Forces Act 2006 rather than the Merchant Navy Code of Conduct, and that they would be classed as combatants and be afforded the rights granted under the Geneva Convention.

Of the six ships, MV Longstone and Beachy Head were on charter to the civilian company Transfennica operating a RoRo cargo ferry service in the Baltic Sea, connecting Hanko in Finland and Lübeck in Germany. Most recently they have been operating on the Immingham to Cuxhaven route for DFDS. Other ships have also been involved in commercial activity with other companies and other militaries. All ships are available to the MoD at very short notice if required. The first four ships have been kept almost constantly busy on MoD duties since the build-up to the Iraq invasion in 2003, but MV Longstone and Beachy Head have seen little MoD service and were sold in 2013 as a result of budget cuts.

Four ships were built by the German company Flensburger Schiffbau-Gesellschaft, the balance being built by Harland and Wolff in Belfast. All are named for British points and headlands. Anvil Point was the last ship built by the Harland and Wolff yard.

Operational history
MV Hartland Point was part of the COUGAR 12 deployment under the Commander Amphibious Task Group and also active in operations off the Cornish coast in 2012. MV Hurst Point made a port call at Gibraltar in August 2013 and was part of the next year's COUGAR 13 deployment. Hartland Point recently worked with the Royal Navy and French Navy on Operation Corsica Lion 2015. MV Hurst Point has been used to replenish the Falkland Islands garrison.

PFI status
According to a Defence Select Committee report, "Four of the Ro-Ro ships are permanently contracted to the MoD with the other two at notice for MoD tasking. For the two ships at notice, one can be accessed in 20 days and the other in 30 days."

In the Autumn 2011, it was stated that the two ships at short notice would be released from the PFI, leaving four ships available for use by the MoD. The ships released were the MV Beachy Head and the MV Longstone, and the RMT union was informed that these vessels would be laid up or sold.

Ships in the class

References

External links

 United Kingdom Strategic Sealift (Roll-On Roll-Off Vessels) (globalsecurity.org)

Auxiliary transport ship classes